Lixil may refer to:
 Lixil Group, a Japanese manufacturer of building materials and housing equipment
 Bumetanide, a pharmaceutical drug